Go Home is a 2015 international co-production film directed by Jihane Chouaib.

Cast 
 Golshifteh Farahani - Nada
 Maximilien Seweryn - Sam
 Wissam Fares - Chadi
 Julia Kassar - Colette
 Mireille Maalouf - Nour
 François Nour - Jalal
 Mohamad Akil

References

External links 

2015 drama films
2015 films
2010s French-language films
2010s Arabic-language films
French drama films
Belgian drama films
Swiss drama films
Lebanese drama films
2015 multilingual films
French multilingual films
Belgian multilingual films
Swiss multilingual films
Lebanese multilingual films
2010s French films